KAXT-CD (channel 1) is a low-power, Class A Decades owned-and-operated television station licensed to both San Francisco and San Jose, California, United States, and serving the San Francisco Bay Area. Owned by Chicago-based Weigel Broadcasting, it is sister to Palo Alto–licensed Heroes & Icons owned-and-operated station KTLN-TV (channel 68). Both stations share studios on Pelican Way in San Rafael, and transmitter facilities on Mount Allison.

Due to its low-power status, KAXT-CD's broadcasting radius does not reach all of the San Francisco Bay Area. Because of that, its market affiliation is shared with KICU-TV (channel 36) which broadcasts Decades on its fourth digital subchannel.

History

Early years
Founded May 31, 1989, the station previously broadcast in analog on UHF channel 22 as KAXT-CA, an affiliate of Spanish-language religious network Tiempos Finales TV, formerly being an affiliate of TBN from 1990 to 2003, and of Almavision from 2003 to 2006.

Changes
On July 31, 2009, KAXT began ATSC digital TV transmissions on UHF channel 42, which had been vacated by KTNC-TV. (The previous month, former owner of KTVU/KICU-TV, 
Cox Media Group unsuccessfully applied for a license to use the same frequency for a KTVU digital translator.) KAXT's digital transmissions used the call sign KAXT-LD, later KAXT-CD. The station was the first digital television station to broadcast 12 video streams on a standard 6 MHz 19.39 Mbit/s ATSC stream. Using statistical multiplexing technology in the encoders and multiplexer, the system provides variable bit rate compression needed to provide full quality standard definition video across all of the channels with enough bandwidth for radio (audio only) services.

Broadcast Engineering nominated KAXT as Station of the Year for 2009, the first low power television station to receive such a distinction.

Since 2017
The DTV virtual channels between KAXT-LD's channel 22 (RF 42, formerly 22) and KRCB's channel 22 (RF 23) in Cotati had significant overlap that caused a PSIP conflict, allowing KAXT-CD to move to a new virtual channel, Channel 1. KAXT had been operating with a PSIP of Channel 1, at one point with 12 different video program streams and one audio-only channel for a total of 13 virtual channels for a few years until the late 2010s.

Weigel Broadcasting agreed to acquire KAXT-CD and KTLN-TV, along with KVOS-TV and KFFV in Seattle, from OTA Broadcasting in a $23.2 million deal on October 18, 2017. The sale was completed on April 15, 2019. By 2018, most of KAXT's Vietnamese-language subchannels had moved to KSCZ-LD.

Programming
Until 2019, KAXT broadcast an electronic program guide, shopping channels, and several channels of ethnic news, entertainment, and religious programming. Several subchannels were produced locally, while the remainder were simulcasts. KAXT is the only television station in the United States that broadcasts on virtual channel 1.

Former affiliations 
Since its transition to digital broadcasting, KAXT has broadcast a wide variety of programming, both local and syndicated:
  TV – family-oriented Spanish-language programming (channel 1.4)
 Cool Music Radio – audio simulcast (channel 1.14)
 Coastal Television Network – tourism-focused channel based in Monterey, California (channel 1.5)
 Colours TV – multicultural programming (channel 1.6)
 Corner Store – informercials (channel 1.9)
 Creation TV Cantonese Christian
 Diya TV – South Asian programming (variously channels 1.2 and 1.5, now on KTSF 26.2)
 FAN – Filipino programming (channel 1.8)
  Vietnamese-language programming (channel 1.11, now on KSCZ 16.1)
 i2TV – public-access television (channel 1.8)
 KCTV/TVHS – Taiwanese programming (channel 1.9)
  – audio simulcast of Christian programming (channel 1.15)
 My Family TV – family-oriented programming (variously channels 1.2, 1.6, and 1.7)
 NetV Vietnamese- and English-language programming (channel 1.12, now on KSCZ 16.16)
  Vietnamese-language programming (channel 1.6, now on KSCZ 16.6)
  – Spanish Christian (channel 1.10)
 PeanutTV – real estate listings (channel 1.12)
  Vietnamese-language programming (channel 1.5, now on KSCZ 16.5)
  Radio – audio simulcast of KZSJ 1120 (channel 1.13)
 Retro TV – classic sitcoms (channel 1.2)
 SKDTV – South Korean programming (channel 1.7)
 TheCoolTV – music videos (variously channels 1.1 and 1.12, now on KTLN 68.2)
 U Channel Chinese/Taiwanese programming (channel 1.9, now on KSCZ 16.9)
  Vietnamese-language programming (channel 1.3, now on KSCZ 16.8)
 Vietface TV – Vietnamese-language programming (channel 1.8, now on KSCZ 16.4)
 Vietoday – Vietnamese-language programming (channel 1.6, now on KTSF 26.5)
 VieTop Vietnamese-language programming (channel 1.7, now on KSCZ 16.7)
 What's On electronic program guide (channel 1.1)

Subchannel

See also
Channel 1 virtual TV stations in the United States
Channel 22 digital TV stations in the United States
Channel 22 low-power TV stations in the United States

Further reading

References

External links

AXT-CD
Decades (TV network) affiliates
Low-power television stations in the United States
1990 establishments in California
Television channels and stations established in 1990
AXT
Television in San Jose, California
Weigel Broadcasting
Companies based in San Rafael, California